Eric Mark Freedman is an American legal scholar and Siggi B. Wilzig Distinguished Professor of Constitutional Rights at Hofstra University. Previously he was Maurice A. Deane Distinguished Professor of Constitutional Law.

Education

Yale Law School, 1977 - 1979. J.D., 1979. 
Columbia University Law School, 1976 - 1977.
Victoria University of Wellington (New Zealand), 1976. Wrote thesis on the history of New Zealand pension law. M.A. in History awarded 1977.
Yale University, 1972 - 1975. B.A., 1975. Double major in History and English.
Princeton University, 1971 - 1972.
The Phillips Exeter Academy, 1968 - 1971. Classical Diploma, 1971.

References

Living people
American legal scholars
Hofstra University faculty
Yale Law School alumni
Victoria University of Wellington alumni
Yale College alumni
Year of birth missing (living people)
Phillips Exeter Academy alumni
Princeton University alumni